Coxing's white-bellied rat or spiny Taiwan niviventer (Niviventer coninga) is a rodent in the family Muridae. The species was first described by Robert Swinhoe in 1864. It is endemic to Taiwan and occurs in broad-leaf forests and their edges and in scrub.

References

Niviventer
Rats of Asia
Mammals of Taiwan
Endemic fauna of Taiwan
Mammals described in 1864
Taxa named by Robert Swinhoe
Taxonomy articles created by Polbot